Tagrin Point is the proposed location of a deep water port to replace the older and shallower port of Port Pepel in Sierra Leone.  It would be connected to existing and new iron ore mined by an upgraded railway line converted to standard gauge.

Ferry 

Tagrin lies on the opposite or northern side of the harbour to the capital of Freetown.

There is a ferry from Kissy to Tagrin Point.

See also 

 Railway stations in Sierra Leone
 Iron ore in Africa

References

External links 
 RailwaysAfrica

Geography of Sierra Leone